Cass High School can refer to:

 Cass High School (Georgia) in Cartersville, Georgia
 Cass High School (Indiana) (Lewis Cass Jr. / Sr. High School) in Walton, Indiana
 Cass Technical High School in Detroit, Michigan